David Berger National Memorial honors the memory of David Mark Berger, a 28-year-old U.S.-born Israeli weightlifter who was one of 11 Israeli athletes killed by Palestinian terrorists in the Munich massacre at the 1972 Summer Olympics. The memorial is dedicated to his memory and to the memory of the ten other athletes who were killed.

The black steel sculpture, a design of broken Olympic rings, is meant to symbolize the interruption of the Munich games by the tragic events, and the eleven segments on which the rings rest represent each athlete whose life was taken.  The sculpture was fabricated by Romanian-born David E. Davis.

The sculpture was installed on the front lawn of the Mayfield Jewish Community Center at 3505 Mayfield Road in Cleveland Heights, Ohio in 1975.  The national memorial designation was authorized on March 5, 1980.  Because of the demolition of the Mayfield Center in 2005, the memorial was moved to the Mandel Jewish Community Center at 26001 South Woodland Road in Beachwood, Ohio.  Although formally under the authority of Cuyahoga Valley National Park, maintenance of the memorial is handled by the community center.

See also
 List of national memorials of the United States

References

External links
 Official NPS website: David Berger National Memorial
  David Mark Berger website

Beachwood, Ohio
Jewish-American history
Monuments and memorials in Ohio
National Memorials of the United States
Outdoor sculptures in Ohio
Protected areas established in 1980
National Park Service areas in Ohio
Steel sculptures in Ohio
1975 sculptures
1980 establishments in Ohio
Berger, David
Cuyahoga Valley National Park
Monuments and memorials on the National Register of Historic Places in Ohio